Sriprakash Jaiswal (born 25 September 1944), also written Shriprakash or Sri  Prakash, is an Indian politician. He served as a member of Parliament for the Indian National Congress and as Minister of State for Home Affairs. He also held ministry of coal for three years, 2011–2014.

Early life 
He completed his education in BNSD Inter College. He married Maya Rani on 28 April 1967. He has two sons and one daughter.

Career 
His first political assignment was serving Kanpur city as its mayor in 1989.

He won the 1999 Lok Sabha election and was reelected in 2004  and 2009. He served as Minister of State for Home Affairs in 2004.

He was elevated to Minister Of State (Independent Charge) in 2009 holding dual charges of Coal and Statistics And Programme Implementation. In 2014 Lok Sabha elections he lost his seat.

Controversies
Jaiswal mostly stayed out of the political spats and media. However, he came into limelight when the Indian coal allocation scam erupted via a leaked Report of Comptroller and Auditor General of India (CAG) in August 2012. He was not the Coal Minister at the time of the crime, but was criticised by the opposition. Jaiswal, however, maintained that the Coal Allocation Process was proper and that the report was disputable. He defended then Prime Minister Manmohan Singh.

Another controversy arose while Jaiswal was attending a cultural event in Kanpur he made sexist remarks, saying 'A new victory and a new marriage have their own importance. But as times passes, the memories of a victory go old and as time passes, a wife gets old, the same charm is not there'. He later apologized. His remarks received nationwide criticism and a petition was filed against him in the Court by Women's Organizations.

References 

1944 births
Living people
Indian National Congress politicians
Marwari people
India MPs 1999–2004
India MPs 2004–2009
India MPs 2009–2014
Union ministers of state of India
Lok Sabha members from Uttar Pradesh
United Progressive Alliance candidates in the 2014 Indian general election
Coal block allocation scam
Politicians from Kanpur
Coal Ministers of India
Indian National Congress politicians from Uttar Pradesh